The UK Rock & Metal Albums Chart is a record chart which ranks the best-selling rock and heavy metal albums in the United Kingdom. Compiled and published by the Official Charts Company, the data is based on each album's weekly physical sales, digital downloads and streams. In 2015, there were 32 albums that topped the 52 published charts. The first number-one album of the year was AC/DC's sixteenth studio album Rock or Bust, which had previously spent a week at number one in December 2014. The final number-one album of the year was Alone in the Universe, the first album credited to Jeff Lynne's ELO, which topped the chart for the week ending 26 November and remained at number one for nine consecutive weeks into January 2016 (including the last six weeks of 2015).

The most successful album on the UK Rock & Metal Albums Chart in 2015 was Muse's seventh studio album Drones, which spent seven consecutive weeks at number one between 20 June and 30 July. Alone in the Universe spent six weeks at number one and was the best-selling rock and metal album of the year, ranking 18th in the UK End of Year Albums Chart. Fall Out Boy's sixth studio album American Beauty/American Psycho and David Gilmour's fourth solo album Rattle That Lock each spent five weeks at number one, ranking as the 28th and 35th best-selling albums in the UK at the end of the year, respectively. Two albums – Pink Floyd's fifteenth studio album The Endless River and All Time Low's sixth studio album Future Hearts – each spent two weeks at number one in 2015.

Chart history

See also
2015 in British music
List of UK Rock & Metal Singles Chart number ones of 2015

References

External links
Official UK Rock & Metal Albums Chart Top 40 at the Official Charts Company
The Official UK Top 40 Rock Albums at BBC Radio 1

2015 in British music
United Kingdom Rock and Metal Albums
2015